Muse Breaks is the debut album of J.Viewz. It was released on the Swedish label, Deeplay Music, in April 2005.
This album has been released worldwide by Deeplay Music (Sweden). Just before its release, the trance duo Infected Mushroom released a remix of "Muse Breaks" on their album IM the Supervisor. This album sold close to 90,000 copies and made the remix a dancefloor hit.

Track listing
 "Under The Sun"
 "Muse Breaks"
 "Worth Light"
 "When Silent It Speaks"
 "Your Country"
 "Room For Me, Room For Sweets"
 "Meantime"
 "Sunswoop"
 "Feeler"
 "Two Steps Away"
 "Protected"

References 
 Deeplay Music website
 Discogs.com
 J.Viewz website

2005 debut albums